Love Scene Number is a South Korean omnibus television series starring Kim Bo-ra, Shim Eun-woo, Ryu Hwa-young and Park Jin-hee. Co-producer MBC TV aired only two of the love scenes, on February 1 and 8.

Synopsis
An omnibus miniseries which tells the complex love stories of four women aged between 23 and 42.

Cast

Main
 Kim Bo-ra as Nam Doo-ah, a 23-year-old college student who majors in social science.
 Shim Eun-woo as Lee Ha-ram, a 29-year-old elementary school teacher who leaves her fiancé at the altar.
 Ryu Hwa-young as Yoon Ban-ya, a 35-year-old adjunct professor who struggles financially.
 Park Jin-hee as Jung Chung-kyung, a 42-year-old furniture designer who discovers her husband's affair.

Supporting
 Kim Young-ah as Jeon Ji-sung, a best-selling essay writer and Sung-moon's wife who appears in all scenes.

Love Scene #23
 Kim Jong-hoon as Yoo Da-ham, a fourth-year student from another university.
 Kim Joon-kyung as Yeon Sung-woo, a graduate student and Doo-ah's senior.
 Kim Sung-hyun as Han Si-han, an engineering student who is one year younger than Doo-ah.
 Ahn Jung-hoon as Do Han-wool, Doo-ah's longtime friend and ex-boyfriend.
Jang Sung-yoon as Lee Joo-yeon, Han-wool's classmate.
Shin Hee-chul as Doo-ah's classmate.
Won Jin-ho as Hong Joon-soo, Han-wool's classmate.

Love Scene #29
 Han Joon-woo as Park Jung-seok, a middle school math teacher and Ha-ram's fiancé.
 Yoon Yoo-sun as Noh Sun-hwa, Ha-ram's mother and George's girlfriend.
 Kim Da-hyun as George, a chef at a famous restaurant and Sun-hwa's boyfriend.
Im Ye-jin as Jung-seok's mother
Lee Joong-yul as Jung-seok's father

Love Scene #35
 Kim Seung-soo as Hyun Sung-moon, Ji-sung's husband and a writer.
Choi Seung-yoon as Ji Hee-sang, Ban-ya's ex-boyfriend.
Song Ji-woo as Oh Han-na, Hee-sang's wife.
Lee Chae-kyung as President of Guleum Cinema
Kim Ba-da as Seo Moo-yeon
Choi Na-moo as Ban-ya's classmate and friend
Kim Sa-hoon as police officer
Kim Tae-young as university department director
Lee Joong-yul as police officer #1
Kim Jong-hoon as police officer #2
Kim Jung-geun as TV announcer

Love Scene #42
 Ji Seung-hyun as Woo Woon-bum, Chung-kyung's husband and business partner.
 Cha Soo-yeon as Kwon Hwa-ran, Myung-hoon's wife and Woon-bum's first love. 
 Hyun Woo-sung as Han Myung-hoon, Hwa-ran's husband and a well known painter.
Lee-ul as Chung-kyung's father
Nam Gi-ae as Chung-kyung and Woon-bum's employee.
Park Chan-young as lumber company manager
Song-hoon as friend at reunion #1
Lee Sung-il as friend at reunion #2
Yong-jin as rude customer

Episodes

Production

Development

Music
The following is the official tracklist of Love Scene Number: Original Soundtrack album, which was released on February 1, 2021. The full musical score was composed by Chung Joong-han which he co-arranged with Brandon Jung.

Songs not featured on the official soundtrack album:

 아무 말도 더 하지 않고 (With No Other Words) by Kang Asol
 기쁜 우리 젊은 날 (Happy Days of Our Youth) by Bae Young Gyeong
 푸른 양철 스쿠터 (Blue Steel Scooter) by My Aunt Mary

Ratings

Notes

References

External links
  
 
 

MBC TV television dramas
Korean-language television shows
2021 South Korean television series debuts
2021 South Korean television series endings
South Korean romance television series
South Korean pre-produced television series
Wavve original programming